Sapozhkovsky (masculine), Sapozhkovskaya (feminine), or Sapozhkovskoye (neuter) may refer to:
Sapozhkovsky District, a district of Ryazan Oblast, Russia
Sapozhkovsky (rural locality), a rural locality (a settlement) in Novosibirsk Oblast, Russia